Melincué is a town (comuna) in the south of the , 287 km from the provincial capital. It was founded in 1872 and recognized officially as a town on 1886-09-03.

Melincué is located immediately north of an endorheic lake (Laguna Melincué) and an associated wetland area that is included in a nature reserve. The fluctuating level of the Melincué Lake and the lack of hydrical infrastructure have often caused the town to suffer floods.

References
 
 

Populated places in Santa Fe Province